Marwari may refer to:

 anything of, from, or related to the Marwar region of Rajasthan, India
 Marwari people, an Indian ethnic group originating in the Marwar region
 Marwari language, the language of the Marwari people
 Marwari, Iran, a village in Kurdistan Province, Iran
 Marwari horse, a horse breed from the Marwar region
 Marwari sheep

Language and nationality disambiguation pages